Jaroslav Pušbauer (31 July 1901, in Prague – 6 June 1976, in Prague) was a Czechoslovak ice hockey player who competed in the 1928 Winter Olympics and in the 1936 Winter Olympics.

In 1928, he participated with the Czechoslovak team in the Olympic tournament.

Eight years later, he was also a member of the Czechoslovak team which finished fourth in the 1936 Olympic tournament.

External links

Olympic ice hockey tournaments 1928 and 1936  

1901 births
1976 deaths
Czech ice hockey defencemen
HC Sparta Praha players
Ice hockey players at the 1928 Winter Olympics
Ice hockey players at the 1936 Winter Olympics
Olympic ice hockey players of Czechoslovakia
Ice hockey people from Prague
People from the Kingdom of Bohemia
Czechoslovak ice hockey defencemen
Charles University alumni